Diuris drummondii, commonly known as the tall donkey orchid is a species of orchid which is endemic to the south-west of Western Australia. It is the tallest Diuris and is distinguished from the similar Diuris emarginata by its larger, more widely spaced flowers. The flowers are pale yellow with brown markings.

Description
Flowering occurs from November to January and is enhanced by fire the previous summer followed by heavy winter rains.

Taxonomy and naming
Diuris drummondii was first formally described in 1840 by John Lindley and the description was published in A Sketch of the Vegetation of the Swan River Colony as an appendix to Edwards's Botanical Register. The specific epithet (drummondii) honours James Drummond who collected the type specimen.

Distribution and habitat
The tall donkey orchid grows in winter-wet depressions that retain at least some moisture until summer, and often flowers with its base submerged. It is found between Northampton and Mount Barker in the Avon Wheatbelt, Jarrah Forest, Swan Coastal Plain and Warren biogeographic regions.

Conservation
Diuris drummondii is classified as "Threatened Flora (Declared Rare Flora — Extant)" by the Western Australian Government Department of Parks and Wildlife.

References 

drummondii
Endemic orchids of Australia
Orchids of Western Australia
Plants described in 1840
Endemic flora of Southwest Australia